Nikolai Valeryevich Durov (born 21 November 1980) is a Russian-born Kittitian programmer and mathematician. He is the elder brother of Pavel Durov, with whom he founded the social networking site VK and later Telegram Messenger.

Early life and education 
Nikolai is the son of Valery Durov, a Doctor of Philological Sciences and a professor of philology during Nikolai's time at Saint Petersburg State University. As a youth, he reportedly could read at an adult level by age three and solve cubic equations by age eight.

Competing as "Nikolai Dourov," he won gold at the International Mathematical Olympiad in the three years he participated of 1996, 1997, and 1998. Furthermore, participating in each yearly contest from 1995 through 1998, he accrued three silver medals and one gold medal in the International Olympiad in Informatics. With his friend Andrey Lopatin, Durov was a member of the Saint Petersburg State University ACM team, which won the ACM International Collegiate Programming Contest in 2000 and 2001.

He received his first PhD from Saint Petersburg State University in 2005 with his thesis "New Approach to Arakelov Geometry". Continuing at the University of Bonn, he obtained in 2007 a second PhD under the supervision of Gerd Faltings with his thesis on singular Arakelov geometry.

Career

Research
Durov introduced commutative algebraic monads as a generalization of local objects in a generalized algebraic geometry. Versions of a tropical geometry, of an absolute geometry over a field with one element and an algebraic analogue of Arakelov geometry were realized in this setup.

He holds the position of senior research fellow at the Laboratory of Algebra and Number Theory at the St Petersburg Department of Steklov Institute of Mathematics of Russian Academy of Sciences.

Other work
 Durov worked as a lead developer of the VK team until 2013.
 Together with his brother Pavel, he founded the instant messenger service Telegram and developed the MTProto protocol for Telegram in 2013.
 Durov is believed to be the author of the original TON (Telegram Open Network) whitepaper.

References 

1980 births
Living people
Russian computer scientists
Mathematicians from Saint Petersburg
International Mathematical Olympiad participants
Saint Petersburg State University alumni
University of Bonn alumni
Competitive programmers
Telegram (software)